Totalitär is a Swedish hardcore punk band formed in 1984-1985 in Hudiksvall. The band plays in the style of D-beat and hardcore punk.

The original members were Poffen, Lanchy, Andreas and Lennart. Their drummer, Spennart joined the band in 1985, but quit during the summer of 1986. The band had shared members with Brainbombs among others. Jörgen and Jesper from the two-piece band TGU were in the band between 1987 and 1989, before leaving to form the punk band The Kristet Utseende.

The band went on a hiatus in 1990. In 1994, Finn Records proposed reforming the band with the resulting album Sin Egen Motståndare, their first full-length studio album. Until 2000, the band record studio materials but rarely played live. It disbanded in 2000. The band also had a fanzine called Antisystem.

In 2006, and after 6 years without recording sessions, they returned to the studio releasing the album Vi Är Eliten.

Members
Poffen - vocals
Andreas - bass
Lanchy - guitar
Jallo Lehto - drums
Previous members
Jörgen - guitar
Jesper - drums

Discography

Albums
1994: Sin egen motståndare
1997: Ni måste bort
2007: Vi är eliten
Compilations
2004: Wallbreaker 1986-1989

EPs
1986: Snabb livsglädje (demo)
1987: Multinationella mördare
1987: Luftslott
1989: Vänd dig inte om
1991: Snabb livsglädje
1998: Klass inte ras
1998: Vansinnets historia
1999: Dom lurar oss
2002: Allting är på låtsas
2002: Spela bort allt du har
2006: Vi är eliten

Split albums
1993: split cassette album with G-ANX - Descarga escandinava
1995: split LP with Dismachine
1999: split EP with Autoritär
2001: split LP with Disclose
2002: split EP/MCD with Dropdead
2003: split EP with Tragedy

References

External links
Discogs
Totalitär fan site

Swedish crust and d-beat groups
1984 establishments in Sweden
Musical groups established in 1984